Teghoria is a locality in Bidhannagar Municipal Corporation of North 24 Parganas district in the Indian state of West Bengal. It is close to Kolkata and also a part of the area covered by Kolkata Metropolitan Development Authority (KMDA).

Location

Teghoria is divided mainly into two broad regions-one called Arjunpur and the area is the one that lies adjacent to the Teghoria Main Road, on either side of the VIP Road that connects the entire stretch from Ultadanga to Dumdum/Kolkata Airport Gate-1.

Culture

Teghoria gains its name from the myth that it was once a settlement constituted by only 3 houses ('te' meaning three and ‘ghar’ meaning house in Bengali). This place is also famous in West Bengal and Bangladesh because it houses the shrine of a human-deity, a spiritual Guru popularly hailed as 'Loknath Baba' (maybe translated as ‘People’s Lord –the Father’). The temple is popularly known as the Loknath Mandir and twice or thrice a year, thousands of devotees from near and far, throng the temple premises and fairs and street shops are set up to celebrate the religious festivals.

Infrastructure

Recently, Teghoria has become a favourite residential site for employees of the IT sector because of its magnificent location. Rajarhat Main Road near Loknath Mandir area is very important and crowded with many Residential Flats, small & big shops and a very good & caring Pre Primary school for kids called Shining Gems Kidz School, which is the major landmark. There is Loknath Market Complex also which has many shops at inside.

From 5 minutes distance of Chinar Park crossing, there are Important urban entertainment and shopping outlets like - City Centre-II, Inox-Rajarhat (multiplex), Shoppers’ Stop, Spencers’,’ which are major landmark in Teghoria. Popular eateries situated barely at a radius of a kilometre or so would be the biriyani hubs-Aminiya and Arsalan chain of restaurants, Dominoes, Pizza Hut, Haldirams’ factory outlet, Tamara, O2, KFC and many more.

Transport

Teghoria is the junction of VIP Road and Major Arterial Road (Haldiram crossing). Teghoria Main Road connects VIP Road to Rajarhat Main Road. Rajarhat Main Road starts from Jora Mandir (near Baguiati) and goes via Loknath Mandir, Chinar Park (crossing with 8-lane roadways Major Arterial Road), Athghara, Kalipark, Raigachhi to Rajarhat Chowmatha.

Being in close proximity to all major roadways that have great communication to every part of Kolkata and to all brands of lifestyle, entertainment and  eateries, the place of Teghoria is calm, tranquil and an ideal residential block in Northern fringes of Kolkata. It is well accessible from Salt Lake Sector-V and the IT-hubs in New Town and most importantly, only two kilometres approximately from the Kolkata International/Domestic Airport (barely five minutes of car ride without traffic). Recently, metro railway tracks are under construction nearby and it is hoped that soon Teghoria will enjoy further faster connectivity with other parts of the metropolitan with the nearest proposed metro-station at Haldiram (around 500 metre from Teghoria VIP Road bus stand).

References

Cities and towns in North 24 Parganas district
Neighbourhoods in North 24 Parganas district
Neighbourhoods in Kolkata
Kolkata Metropolitan Area